J. Edward Hakes left his mark on Christian higher education, his book being assigned as required reading in the classrooms of several Christian colleges.  He served as president of Cornerstone University (1954–1958) and academic dean of Trinity College (1969–1980).

Cornerstone University citation:
"In 1955, the Executive Board of the institution moved to allow the Seminary to admit only students with baccalaureate degrees, thus becoming a true graduate school of theological studies. At the same time, steps  being taken with the state Board of Education to change both the level and the function of the Bible Institute into a degree-granting, undergraduate institution. Finances and faculty did not adequately support such a transition to a four-year college at that time, but the seeds were planted during the presidency of Dr. J. Edward Hakes (1953-58)."

Education 
Graduate of Wheaton College
Graduate of Northern Baptist Seminary

Published works
An Introduction to evangelical Christian education. (Chicago: Moody Press, 1964).

References

American Christian theologians
Wheaton College (Illinois) alumni
Cornerstone University faculty